Wellington is a city in Carbon County, Utah, United States. The population was 1,676 at the 2010 census. The community was settled in 1878 by a band of thirteen Mormons led by Jefferson Tidwell. The town was named for Justus Wellington Seeley, Jr., of the Emery County Court. Many residents commute to nearby Price for their jobs, or work in one of the various coal mines in the area.

Geography
Wellington is located southwest of the center of Carbon County at  (39.539476, -110.729667), along U.S. routes 6/191, which leads northwest  to Price, the county seat, and southeast  to Green River.

It is just north of the Price River, a southeast-flowing tributary of the Green River.

Climate
This climatic region is typified by large seasonal temperature differences, with warm to hot (and often humid) summers and cold (sometimes severely cold) winters.  According to the Köppen Climate Classification system, Wellington has a humid continental climate, abbreviated "Dfb" on climate maps.

Demographics

As of the census of 2000, there were 1,666 people, 576 households, and 459 families residing in the city. The population density was 473.9 people per square mile (182.7/km2). There were 661 housing units at an average density of 188.0 per square mile (72.5/km2). The racial makeup of the city was 94.72% White, 0.12% African American, 1.08% Native American, 0.18% Asian, 0.12% Pacific Islander, 2.04% from other races, and 1.74% from two or more races. Hispanic or Latino of any race were 4.92% of the population.

There were 576 households, out of which 47.2% had children under the age of 18 living with them, 62.3% were married couples living together, 13.0% had a female householder with no husband present, and 20.3% were non-families. 17.9% of all households were made up of individuals, and 6.9% had someone living alone who was 65 years of age or older. The average household size was 2.89 and the average family size was 3.27.

In the city, the population was spread out, with 33.3% under the age of 18, 13.1% from 18 to 24, 25.1% from 25 to 44, 19.9% from 45 to 64, and 8.7% who were 65 years of age or older. The median age was 28 years. For every 100 females, there were 96.2 males. For every 100 females age 18 and over, there were 91.4 males.

The median income for a household in the city was $36,979, and the median income for a family was $40,521. Males had a median income of $41,053 versus $17,167 for females. The per capita income for the city was $14,721. About 10.7% of families and 14.7% of the population were below the poverty line, including 20.6% of those under age 18 and 4.7% of those age 65 or over.

Education
Wellington is located in the Carbon School District and is home to an elementary school. Students attend middle school and high school in Price.

See also

 List of cities and towns in Utah

References

External links

 City of Wellington official website

Cities in Carbon County, Utah
Cities in Utah
Populated places established in 1878
1878 establishments in Utah Territory